Francis Rogers may refer to:

Francis Rogers (cricketer) (1897–1967), English cricketer
Francis Rogers (lawyer) (1791–1851), English judge and legal writer
Francis Rogers (politician) (1868–1925), English Liberal politician

See also
Frank Rogers (disambiguation)